Sashi Mahendra Singh (1920–1990) was a Fijian football coach who managed the national team. He was nicknamed "the Father of Ba Soccer".

Singh was an Indo-Fijian, the father of Billy Singh who also managed the national team.

References

1920 births
1990 deaths
Fijian football managers
Fiji national football team managers
Fijian people of Indian descent